The Biathlon European Championships are the top-european competitions in biathlon. The first edition was held in 1994, with sprint, pursuit, individual and relay. The number of events has grown significantly over the years. Till 2015, the competitions included also junior events but since 2016 the Junior Championships are held separately.

Participation of non-European competitors 
Even though the event is called European Championships, the event is not restricted to European athletes only. The full name of the competition is Open Biathlon European Championships, meaning that biathletes from non-European countries are eligible to participate and their results being recognised. There are three instances in which non-European competitors have won medals. Lowell Bailey from the United States became the first non-European to win a medal by winning bronze in the Junior Sprint event in 2001, followed by another bronze in the Junior Pursuit. Audrey Vaillancourt of Canada became the first non-European athlete to win gold in the competition, winning the Women's 15 km individual in 2014.

Editions

Winners

Men

Women

Mixed

Medals table 
Updated after 2023 Championships

References

External links
Sports 123 biathlon results

 
Europe
Biathlon in Europe
European championships
Recurring sporting events established in 1994